Elvis Sarić (born 21 July 1990) is a Bosnian professional footballer who plays as a midfielder for Chinese Super League club Qingdao Hainiu.

Sarić started his professional career at GOŠK Dubrovnik, before joining Lučko in 2009. Four years later, he moved to Vinogradar. In 2014, he switched to Inter Zaprešić. Later that year, he went to Sloboda Tuzla. Sarić joined Sarajevo in 2016. Two years later, he signed with Suwon Bluewings. A year later, he was transferred to Al Ahli. He moved to Gorica in 2021. The following year, he went back to Suwon Bluewings.

Sarić made his senior international debut for Bosnia and Herzegovina in 2018, earning 19 caps until 2021.

Club career

Early career
Sarić came through youth setup of his hometown club GOŠK Dubrovnik. He made his professional debut in 2008 at the age of 18. After leaving the team, he played in Croatia further for Lučko, Vinogradar and Inter Zaprešić.

In the summer of 2014, he joined Bosnian side Sloboda Tuzla.

In June 2016, he switched to Sarajevo.

Suwon Bluewings
In July 2018, Sarić moved to South Korean outfit Suwon Bluewings on a three-year deal. He made his competitive debut for the club on 11 July against Jeonnam Dragons. On 8 August, he scored his first goal for Suwon Bluewings in Korean FA Cup game against Cheonan City. Seven weeks later, he scored a brace against Ulsan Hyundai, his first league goals for the team.

Al Ahli
In July 2019, Sarić was transferred to Saudi Arabian side Al Ahli for an undisclosed fee. He made his official debut for the club against Al-Adalah on 22 August.

In September 2020, he suffered a severe knee injury, which was diagnosed as anterior cruciate ligament tear and was ruled out for at least six months. He returned to the pitch on 15 April 2021, over seven months after the injury.

Later stage of career
In September, Sarić signed with Gorica.

In January 2022, he returned to Suwon Bluewings.

In February 2023, Sarić joined Chinese Super League club Qingdao Hainiu.

International career
In January 2018, Sarić received his first senior call-up to Bosnia and Herzegovina, for friendly games against the United States and Mexico. He debuted against the former on 28 January.

On 8 September, in a 2018–19 UEFA Nations League game against Northern Ireland, Sarić scored his first senior international goal.

Personal life
Sarić married his long-time girlfriend Ivona in June 2020.

Career statistics

Club

International

Scores and results list Bosnia and Herzegovina's goal tally first, score column indicates score after each Sarić goal.

References

External links

1990 births
Living people
Sportspeople from Dubrovnik
Citizens of Bosnia and Herzegovina through descent
Bosnia and Herzegovina footballers
Bosnia and Herzegovina international footballers
Bosnia and Herzegovina expatriate footballers
Association football midfielders
NK GOŠK Dubrovnik players
NK Lučko players
NK Vinogradar players
NK Inter Zaprešić players
FK Sloboda Tuzla players
FK Sarajevo players
Suwon Samsung Bluewings players
Al-Ahli Saudi FC players
HNK Gorica players
Qingdao Hainiu F.C. (1990) players
Second Football League (Croatia) players
First Football League (Croatia) players
Croatian Football League players
Premier League of Bosnia and Herzegovina players
K League 1 players
Saudi Professional League players
Chinese Super League players
Expatriate footballers in South Korea
Expatriate footballers in Saudi Arabia
Expatriate footballers in China
Bosnia and Herzegovina expatriate sportspeople in Croatia
Bosnia and Herzegovina expatriate sportspeople in South Korea
Bosnia and Herzegovina expatriate sportspeople in Saudi Arabia
Bosnia and Herzegovina expatriate sportspeople in China